Euxanthe eurinome, the common forest queen, is a butterfly in the family Nymphalidae. It is found in Senegal, Guinea, Sierra Leone, Liberia, Ivory Coast, Ghana, Nigeria, Equatorial Guinea, Cameroon, Gabon, the Democratic Republic of the Congo, Angola, the Central African Republic, Uganda, Kenya and Ethiopia. The habitat consists of lowland evergreen forests and dry and degraded forests.

Adults are attracted to carnivore dung and fruit.

The larvae feed on Afzelia africana, Deinbollia pinnata, Blighia and Phialodiscus species.

Subspecies
Euxanthe eurinome eurinome (Senegal, Guinea, Sierra Leone, Liberia, Ivory Coast, Ghana, Nigeria, Bioko, southern Cameroon)
Euxanthe eurinome ansellica (Butler, 1870) (southern Cameroon, Gabon, eastern Democratic Republic of the Congo, northern Angola, Central African Republic, eastern and central Uganda)
Euxanthe eurinome birbirica Ungemach, 1932 (Uganda: north to the west of the Madi district, western Kenya, south-western Ethiopia)
Euxanthe eurinome celadon Le Cerf, 1923 (Gabon)

References

External links
BOLD images

Butterflies described in 1775
Charaxinae
Taxa named by Pieter Cramer